"Ambivalent" is a 2018 song by the Japanese group Keyakizaka46.

Ambivalent may also refer to:

Albums 
 "", a 2007 album by Tomoyasu Hotei

Songs 
 "Ambivalent", song by Eve from Otogi, 2018

See also
 Ambivalence, a state of having simultaneous conflicting reactions, beliefs, or feelings towards some object